The first introduction of a mutual fund in India occurred in 1963, when the Government of India launched Unit Trust of India (UTI). UTI enjoyed a monopoly in the Indian mutual fund market until 1987,  when a host of other government-controlled Indian financial companies established their own funds, including State Bank of India, Canara Bank and by Punjab National Bank.

Mutual funds are an under-tapped market in India

Despite being available in the market, less than 10% of Indian households have invested in mutual funds. A recent report on Mutual Fund Investments in India published by research and analytics firm, Boston Analytics, suggests investors are holding back from putting their money into mutual funds due to their perceived high risk and a lack of information on how mutual funds work. There are 46 Mutual Funds as of June 2013.

The primary reason for not investing appears to be correlated with city size.  Among respondents with a high savings rate, close to 40% of those who live in metros and Tier I cities considered such investments to be very risky, whereas 33% of those in Tier II cities said they did not know how or where to invest in such assets.

In 2019, Asset under management (AUM) of the mutual fund industry rose by 13% to 24 trillion in 2018 by November

Distribution
Mutual funds in India are distributed mainly in 2 ways:-

Online 
Customers can buy mutual funds online via the corresponding asset management company's website or via brokers. There are a number of new platforms that have come which offer direct mutual funds in their platform. Subscribers can buy mutual funds from these platforms. Direct mutual funds provide better returns, generally between .5% to 1.5% more than their regular counterparts. This is due to the fact that brokers charges are excluded from the returns. A 1% deduction from a return of 12% from mutual funds, leads to a 8.33% lesser return to the investor, which is a huge amount.

Offline 
Most of the asset management company have an offline distribution network. These distributors mainly sell regular mutual funds which carry some commission on it. FundsIndia, NJ, Prudent, QFund are some of the popular distributors in India.

Average assets under management
Assets under management (AUM) is a financial term denoting the market value of all the funds being managed by a financial institution (a mutual fund, hedge fund, private equity firm, venture capital firm, or brokerage house) on behalf of its clients, investors, partners, depositors, etc.
The average assets under management of all mutual funds in India for the quarter Dec 2015 to Mar 2016(in ₹ Lakh) is given below: or

Mutual Fund Acquisitions

References

 
Financial services companies of India
1963 establishments in India